Governor Peterson may refer to:

Russell W. Peterson (1916–2011), 66th Governor of Delaware
Val Peterson (1903–1983), 26th Governor of Nebraska
Walter R. Peterson Jr. (1922–2011), 72nd Governor of New Hampshire

See also
Hjalmar Petersen (1890–1968), 23rd Governor of Minnesota